Speed is a 2007 Indian action thriller film directed by Vikram Bhatt and produced by Pammi Baweja.

The film stars Zayed Khan, Sanjay Suri, Urmila Matondkar, Aftab Shivdasani, Aashish Chaudhary and Tanushree Dutta, while Amrita Arora makes a special appearance and Sophie Chaudhary, Suhasini Mulay, Rajendranath Zutshi and Ashwini Kalsekar are featured in supporting roles. It was released on 19 October 2007. The film is inspired by the 2004 American film Cellular.

Plot

In Kuala Lumpur, an Mi6 Agent is on a pursuit which is being chased by some gangsters, rushes to his apartment room and try to send a message to Mi5 with the code "EQUINOXA 666007" just before being shot dead by those gangsters. The gangsters then call a man on the phone to inform him that the job is done and the secret is saved. The dead agent's finger luckily falls on the keyboard, and the message is sent to Mi5.

On 22 September, in London, Sandeep Arora aka Sandy arrives from India to convince his angry girlfriend Sanjana to return with him to India so that they can get married. From the airport, he boards a taxi and starts interacting with the driver, who is a Pakistani, named Iqbal Qureshi, and tells the latter, his reason to come to London. In the same city, Siddharth Verma "Sid", who is a chef in a restaurant, lives with his wife, Richa Verma, who is a Science teacher, and their son Bobby Verma. Sandy then arrives at the hotel where his girlfriend, Sanjana is staying and finds her in order to convince her to forget the past and marry him, but Sanjana is very angry about Sandy's childishness and says that marriage is not a child's play, but Sandy keeps on trying so that she forgives him.

Sid then reaches the restaurant he works in but enters a secret office with a hidden back door inside the restaurant, and it is then revealed that he is actually a secret agent of MI5. Afterward, his junior co-agent Pam informs him that their boss James, the head of Mi-5, has asked for him and also states that, James has something big for him and can send him on a big mission. Sid soon meets James, who briefs him about the email that contains the code which was sent by the agent from Kuala Lumpur and also informed him that the email came with a red signal alert, an S.O.S. channel which means an imminent danger to them and can lead to a terrorist attack and orders Sid to crack the code immediately. On the other hand, at Sid's house, Richa returns from her work while talking on the phone and soon finds out that her telephone connection and outside camera connections are disabled and also finds a man standing near her window. It is the same man who the gangsters called in Kuala Lumpur named Kabir Khan who is there to kidnap Richa and eventually succeeds and takes her to an unknown location and holds her captive along with the aid of his partner Monica Monteiro. At Mi-5's office, Sid and Pam try to crack the code, and Sid finally understands that the code EQUINOXA, where 'EQUINOX' means when day and night are equal, which happens twice in a year, only on 23 March and 22 September and 'A' stands for Autumn. Right after that, Pam freaks out, telling Sid that today is, in fact, '22 September'.

Afterward, Sid finds that his car's alarm has gone off, and he goes to check it and gets a call from Kabir, who knows everything about him and tells him to open his car's trunk only to find a video-CD of his wife's captivity. Sid gets furious towards Kabir, threatening him that he doesn't have any idea what Sid can do, and Kabir replies that he knows what Sid is capable of, and that's why they have chosen him for their desired work. Sid then asks about the work, but Kabir first orders him to break the CD and throw it in the dustbin, but Sid throws it without breaking it, and Kabir says he told him to break it and then fell it, so he asks him to do it again and thus, Sid finds out that they are keeping an eye on him through various CC-TV Cameras and gets ordered to reach Kensington Road. In the meantime, Richa gets restless and cries for help as she knows nothing about what is going on and why she is kidnapped. Suddenly her eyes catch the sight of the broken telephone lying on the ground, which Kabir had smashed accidentally while trying to scare her with an axe, and Richa thought of calling Sid's restaurant. On the other hand, Sandy is still trying to convince Sanjana and tells her that she has brought a surprise gift for her and runs down to the lobby to get it from his bag. Richa hardly dials a number to connect to a call and accidentally rings Sandy asking to be reached out to Siddharth Verma, but Sandy thinks someone messing around with him when suddenly Kabir enters the room where Richa is and gives her to talk to Sid, and Richa explains everything to Sid, and the latter says to describe the place to him, and Kabir slaps Richa for showing smartness and tells Sid to go to Barclays Bank where he will get further instructions, while Sandy hears everything over the broken telephone and agrees to help Richa and the latter tells him to go to a police station and make her speak with an officer. Therefore, Sandy rushes to a police station with Iqbal and tells the officer in charge there everything, but while the officer was on the phone, Richa could not speak as Kabir and Sophie were in front of her, and the officer gets angry, thinking Sandy is joking and throws him out, and then Richa tells him the reason why she could not talk. In Barclays' Sid figures out a way to make someone else get disguised as him while he can search for Richa. Kabir plans to bring in Richa's son Bobby too, and Richa gets even more scared and requests Sandy to reach Bobby's school before Kabir does and save him and also describes how Sandy can recognize Bobby and which class he is in. As Sandy finds out he needs a backup, he rings Sanjana, and both reach there on time, but while they were busy talking with each other, Bobby was already taken away by Kabir, and Sandy rushes to follow them but eventually loses them. Monica finds that Sid is roaming outside, thus fooling them. She calls him and threatens to kill Richa and tells him to return to the bank and withdraw the money they have transferred to his account and take the money to the location, they said.

At a National Security office, Rohan Nath asks for a leave from his superior but is 
turned down as the Indian Prime Minister, Gayatri Devi is arriving, and Rohan's name has been highly recommended. Rohan soon makes a good impression in front of the PM and her son Raaj who is the Deputy Chief of her party. Being pleased with Rohan's duty, the PM allows Rohan to spend some quality time with his girlfriend, Sameera, whose birthday is on the following day. While leaving the hotel, Sameera forgets her car keys and returns to the room and finds that Rohan is actually a rogue officer, aiding Kabir to kill the PM and tries to stop him but gets killed at the hands of Rohan. The hotel manager finds the dead body and informs it to Rohan, the PM and Raaj, but Rohan covers it up and says he'll take care of everything and the conference will surely take place if this is what the PM wants.

On the road, Sanjana catches up with the car in which Kabir is taking Bobby to his den and follows it. While Richa is talking to Sandy, she founds a bracelet type-thing over which is written 'Princess Daisy' and Sandy rushes to a bookshop in the hope of finding any clue about it, and the bookshop owner tells him that Princess Daisy was a horse that died in a stable fire and Sandy immediately catches the point and gets the address of the burned stable from the owner and understands that Richa is there, on the other hand, Richa sees Bobby is also being kidnapped and loses all hope and thanks to Sandy for all the help and disconnects the line saying that no can help her now on what she is up to, but Sandy says he will save her at any cost and heads to the location. In the nick of time, Sanjana reaches there and saves Bobby, and Richa also knocks down the guards and gets herself out only to know about Kabir's plans to kill the Indian Prime Minister and using Sid to kill her and frame him. Both Sanjana and Richa unite and try to escape but fail. Finally, Sandy arrives and blasts the car he came in with and kills all the henchmen and eventually gets in a fight with Monica, where Monica gets killed accidentally by her own fault. Sandy saves everybody there and discovers Kabir's plans. Sid reaches the hotel and gets the idea that, they will use him to kill the PM and frame him. Afterward, he meets Rohan and Kabir, who explains him the plan, but Sid identifies Kabir as an ex-officer of Indian Intelligence and asks him why he is doing all these and gets replied that Kabir and his brother were kept rotting in a Pakistani jail for two years, they continuously wrote letters to the government asking for help, but the Indian Government refused to recognize them. More so, his brother died in front of him, tolerating the trashing of the Pakistanis for that government, who left his body unclaimed and ordered Sid that if he wants to see his wife and child alive, he wants to see the PM dead.

Just before everything goes down, Sandy and Richa arrive at the hotel and start talking with Rohan and tell him about everything and he acts as if he is helping and takes Richa towards room 1426, where Sid is, and makes Sandy wait in the lobby and eventually shows his true colors. He then points the gun towards Richa and warns Sid to do as per he says, and orders his man in the lobby to kill Sandy. Right then, Kabir passes in the lobby, and Sandy recognizes him from the voiceover on the phone with the line that Kabir continuously says 'Relax Captain, Relax!' and follows him to the washroom and hides behind a toilet door and overhears that this plot is the brainchild of Raaj. He is doing this to become the PM while also using the potential sympathy votes of her murder to win the next elections. But Kabir is informed about Sandy by his men and looks in the bathroom and finds him and Sandy get captured by Kabir's men, and after a big brawl, Sandy bashes all the thugs and fights his way out, and run towards room 1426 to stop the incident. Right, when Sid nearly pulls the trigger, Sandy jumps in, stops Sid, and the bullet hits the stage, and some piece of wood fall on the PM and everybody runs, and the PM is taken inside, and by a slip of the tongue Raaj shouts that he doesn't understand why an Indian will shoot at the PM and the PM understood that the main culprit is no one except her own son and gets him arrested. Sandy then runs after Kabir, who is already doing a runner, Sid now calls the shots and holds Rohan at his gunpoint but ends up in a fight where Sid gets wounded with a knife but ultimately shoots Rohan to death. Kabir returns to the basement, where he was expecting Sandy to be found dead, but Sandy catches up with him before he could flee again. Both then engage in a big fight, and after a raging brawl, Kabir ends up with a chandelier crossing through his body as Sandy lets loose the knot of it, and thus, Sandy defeats Kabir.

Two months later, Sandy is given an award from the PM for his bravery and saving the life of a stranger by risking his own life. He marries Sanjana and makes plans for their honeymoon, and then Richa calls over to congratulate them, and on the other hand, Sid and Richa too lead a happy life with their son Bobby.

Cast 
 Zayed Khan as Sandeep Arora (Sandy)
 Urmila Matondkar as Richa Verma, Siddharth's wife
 Sanjay Suri as Siddharth Verma (Sid), MI5 agent
 Aftab Shivdasani as Kabir Khan, ex-intelligence officer, the main antagonist
 Aashish Chaudhary as Rohan Nath
 Tanushree Dutta as Sanjana, Sandeep's girlfriend
 Amrita Arora as Sameera Mehra (Sam)
 Sophie Chaudhary as Monica Montero, Kabir's girlfriend
 Suhasini Mulay as Indian Prime Minister Gayatri Sinha
 Rajendranath Zutshi as Raaj
 Ashwini Kalsekar as Pam, Siddharth's colleague
 Rajesh Khera as Iqbal Qureshi
 Yaseen Choudhry as Bobby Verma

Soundtrack

The music of the film was composed by Pritam, and lyrics were written by Mayur Puri.

Reception
Taran Adarsh of IndiaFM gave the film 2.5 out of 5, writing ″SPEED belongs to two actors primarily -- Urmila Matondkar and Zayed Khan. Urmila handles her part with dexterity and adds freshness to the goings-on since she has cut down on her acting assignments. Zayed is cool and suits the role well. Aashish Chowdhary springs a surprise. In fact, the actor is getting likable with every release. Sanjay Suri is a fine actor, but the spark is missing this time. Aftab too isn't fiery enough and his look is a complete put-off. Tanushree Dutta needs to go easy on her makeup, otherwise she's passable. Sophie Chaudhary makes her presence felt. Amrita Arora looks glamorous. On the whole, SPEED is an interesting thriller that has the advantage of being a solo release. Rajeev Masand gave the film zero out of 5, writing ″It’s one big zero for Vikram Bhatt’s Speed, it’s one those films that make you wish you hadn’t stepped into the cinema at all.″ D. Morgan of Rediff.com gave the film 1 out of 5, writing ″If someone calls you to see this film even for free, hang up!″

Soundtrack list
Tikhi Tikhi - Joi Barua
Wanna Wanna (Be with you forever) - Sunidhi Chauhan and Shaan
Loving You - Sonu Nigam and Antara Mitra
Hello - Shaan and Sunidhi Chauhan

References

External links
 

2007 films
2000s Hindi-language films
Films directed by Vikram Bhatt
2007 action thriller films
2000s crime action films
2007 crime thriller films
Indian crime thriller films
Indian crime action films
Indian action thriller films
MI5 in fiction
Films set in England
Films about mobile phones
Films about kidnapping in India
Indian remakes of American films
Films about terrorism in India